This is a list of co-operative federations. For a list of individual Co-operative Enterprises, please see List of cooperatives.

International 
 International Co-operative Alliance (ICA)
 World Council of Credit Unions (WOCCU)
 International Co-operative Agricultural Organisation (ICAO)
 Consumer Co-operatives Worldwide (CCW)
 International Co-operative Fisheries Organisation (ICFO)
 International Health Co-operative Organisation (IHCO)
 International Co-operative Housing Organisation (ICA Housing)
 International Co-operative and Mutual Insurance Federation (ICMIF)
 International Organisation of Industrial, Artisanal and Service Producers' Co-operatives (CICOPA)
 International Cooperative Banking Association. (ICBA)

North America 
 North American Students of Cooperation (NASCO)

Canada 
 BC Coop Association (BCCA)
 Calgary Co-op
 Canadian Co-operative Association (CCA)
 Canadian Worker Co-operative Federation (CWCF)
 Conseil Canadien de la Coopération (CCC)
 Federated Co-operatives
 Fédération québécoise des coopératives en milieu scolaire
 Ontario Co-operative Association
 Red River Co-op
 Saskatoon Co-op

Mexico 
 Caja Libertad S.C.L.
 Caja Popular Mexicana
 Confederación Nacional de Cooperativas de Actividades Diversas (CNC)
 Federación de Cajas Populares Alianza S.C. de R.L. de C.V.
 Federación Nacional de Cooperativas Financieras UNISAP S.C. de R.L. de C.V.

United States 
 ACDI/VOCA
 CF Industries (demutualized 2005)
 CHF International
 CHS, Inc.
 Cooperation Jackson
 Credit Union National Association (CUNA)
 CUNA Mutual Group
 Farmland Industries (liquidated 2003)
Federation of Egalitarian Communities (FEC)
 National Cooperative Bank (NCB)
 National Cooperative Business Association (NCBA) (formerly the Cooperative League of America)
 National Co+op Grocers (NCG)
 National Rural Electric Cooperative Association (NRECA)
 Network of Bay Area Worker Cooperatives (NoBAWC)
 Northern States Co-operative League (NSCL, established 1921)
 Philadelphia Area Cooperative Alliance (PACA)
 Portland Alliance of Worker Cooperatives (PAWC)
 U.S. Federation of Worker Cooperatives (USFWC)
 Valley Alliance of Worker Cooperatives

Europe 
 Cooperatives Europe

Austria 
 Oesterreichischer Verband gemeinnütziger Bauvereinigungen - Revisionsverband

Belarus 
 Belorussian Union of Consumer Societies (BELKOOPSOYUZ)

Belgium 
 Arcopar
 Fédération Belge des Coopératives (FEBECOOP)
 Office des pharmacies coopératives de Belgique    (OPHACO)
 P&V Verzekeringen

Bulgaria 
 Central Co-operative Union (CCU)
 National Union of Workers Producers Co-operatives of Bulgaria

Croatia 
 Croatian Association of Co-operatives

Cyprus 
 Co-operative Central Bank Ltd.
 Cyprus Turkish Co-operative Central Bank Ltd
 Pancyprian Co-operative Confederation

Czech Republic 
 Co-operative Association of the Czech Republic

Denmark 
 Agricultural Council of Denmark
 Co-op Union of Denmark (DKF)
 FDB Consumer Co-operative Denmark

Estonia 
 Estonian Co-operative Association (ECA)

Finland 
 Pellervo Confederation of Finnish Co-operatives
 SOK Association SOKL

France 
 Confédération Générale des Sociétés Coopératives de Production (CGSCOP)
 Confédération Nationale de la Mutualité, de la Coopération et du Crédit Agricoles (CNMCCA)
 Confédération Nationale du Crédit Mutuel
 Crédit Agricole S.A.
 Fédération Nationale des Coopératives de Consommateurs (FNCC)
 Groupe Crédit Coopératif
 Groupement National de la Coopération (GNC)

Georgia 
 Georgian Consumer Co-operative Alliance (TSEKAVSHIRI)

Germany 
 Bundesverband deutscher Wohnungsunternehmen (GdW)
 Deutscher Genossenschafts-und Raiffeisenverband (DGRV)
 Edeka Zentrale AG & Co. KG
 Konsumverband eG
 Zentralverband deutscher Konsumgenossenschaften (ZdK)  
 Union Coop - Föderation gewerkschaftlicher Kollektivbetriebe (Union Coop)

Greece 
 Panhellenic Confederation of Union of Agricultural Co-operatives (PASEGES)

Hungary 
 Hungarian Industrial Association (OKISZ)
 National Federation of Agricultural Co-operatives and Producers (MOSZ)
 National Federation of Consumer Co-operatives & Trade Associations (AFEOSZ - Co-op Hungary)

Italy 
 Associazione Generale delle Cooperative Italiane (AGCI)
 Confederazione delle Cooperative Italiane (CONFCOOPERATIVE)
 Lega Nazionale delle Cooperative e Mutue (LEGACOOP)
 Alleanza delle Cooperative Italiane

Ireland 

 Co-operative Housing Irelan

 Credit Union Development Association

 Irish Co-operative Organisation Society

 Irish League of Credit Unions

Latvia 
 Latvian Central Co-operative Union (TURIBA)

Lithuania 
 Lithuanian Union the Consumer Societies

Malta 
 Koperattivi Malta - Cooperatives Malta
 Malta Co-operative Federation (MCF)

Moldova 
 Union of Consumer Societies

Netherlands 
 Oikocredit - Ecumenical Development Co-operative Society
 Rabobank
 Sociale Coöperatie Soco Soco
 Moerwijk Coöperatie
 Southwest at its best
 FrieslandCampina

Norway 
 Coop NKL BA
 Federation of Norwegian Agricultural Co-operatives (Norsk Landbrukssamvirke)
 Union of Co-operative Housing & Building Associations (NBBL)
Tine (company) Dairy cooperative

Poland 
 national Association of Co-operative Savings & Credit Unions (NACSCU)
 National Auditing Union of Housing Co-operatives
 National Auditing Union of Workers' Co-operatives (ZLSP)
 National Co-operative Council (NCC)
 National Supervision Union of Consumer Co-operatives (SPOLEM)
 National Union of Co-operative Banks (KZBS)

Portugal 
 Confederaçao Nacional de Cooperativas Agricolas & Crédito (CONFAGRI)
 Confederation of Portuguese Co-operatives (CONFECOOP)
 Co-operative Sector Institute (INSCOOP)

Romania 
 National Union of Consumer Co-operatives (CENTROCOOP)
 National Union of Handicraft & Production Co-operatives of Romania (UCECOM)
 National Union of Agricultural Cooperatives from the Crop Sector (UNCSV)

Russia 
 Central Union of Consumer Societies (CENTROSOJUZ)
 International Council of Consumer Co-operatives (CONSUMINTER)
 Koopvneshtorg Ltd. (COOP TRADE)
 Moscow Regional Union of Consumer Societies

Serbia 
 Co-operative Union of Serbia
 Co-operative Union of Yugoslavia

Slovakia 
 Co-operative Union of the Slovak Republic

Slovenia 
 Co-operative Union of Slovenia

Spain 
 Confederació de Cooperativas de Catalunya
 Confederación de Cooperativas Agrarias de España (CCAE)
 Confederación de Cooperativas de Euskadi
 Confederación Empresarial de Economia Social (CEPES)
 Confederación Española de Cooperativas de Trabajo Asociado (COCETA)
 Confederación Española de Cooperativas de Consumidores y Usuarios (HISPACOOP)
 Fundación Espriu
 Mondragon Corporation
 Unión Nacional de Cooperativas de Consumo y Usuarios de España (UNCCUE)

Sweden 
 OKQ8 The Oil Company - OK, now joint with Q8
 Federation of Swedish Farmers (LRF)
 Folksam (FOLKSAM)
 HSB (Union of Housing Co-operatives)
 Kooperativa Förbundet (KF)
 Riksbyggen (Co-operative Housing Union)
 Swedbank, formed from a merger in the 90's between the cooperative The Workers Bank and The Farmers Bank

Switzerland
Allgemeine Baugenossenschaft Zürich (ABZ)
Fenaco

Turkey 
 Central Union of Turkish Agricultural Credit Co-operatives
 National Co-operative Union of Turkey
 Taris Union of Agricultural Co-operative Societies
 The Central Union of Turkish Fishery Cooperatives
 The Central Union of Turkish Forestry Cooperatives
 Turkish Co-operative Association
 Union of Sugar Beet Growers' Production Co-operative (PANKOBIRLIK)

Ukraine 
 Central Union of Consumer Associations of Ukraine (UKOOPSPILKA)
 Ukrainian National Credit Union Association (UNCUA)

United Kingdom 
 Association of British Credit Unions (ABCUL, Great Britain only)
 Confederation of Co-operative Housing
 Co-operative Party
 Co-operative Financial Services
 Co-operatives UK
 Employee Ownership Association
 Irish League of Credit Unions (federates Northern Ireland credit unions)
 Radical Routes
 Seeds for Change Network
 Students for Cooperation
 The Co-operative Group

Oceania

Australia 
 The Co-op Federation
 Business Council of Co-operatives and Mutuals (BCCM)

New South Wales 
 Cooperative Federation of New South Wales

South Australia 
 Cooperative Federation of South Australia

Western Australia 
 Cooperatives WA

Fiji 
 Fiji Cooperative Union

New Zealand 
 New Zealand Cooperatives Association

Africa 
 Africa Confederation of Co-operative Savings and Credit Associations (ACCOSCA)

Benin 
 Fédération des Caisses d'Epargne et de Crédit Agricole Mutuel (FECECAM)

Botswana 
 Botswana Co-operative Association (BOCA)
 Botswana Savings and Credit Association (BOSCCA)

Burkina Faso 
 Union Régionale des Coopératives d'Epargne et de Crédit du Bam (URC-BAM)

Cape Verde 
 Fédération Nationale des Coopératives de Consommation (FENACOOP)

Cóte d'Ivoire 
 Société Coopérative d'Abgoville (SCAGBO)
 Union Régionale des Entreprises Coopératives (URECOS-CI)

Egypt 
 Central Agricultural Co-operative Union (CACU)
 Central Housing Co-operative Union (ARE)
 Central Productive Co-operative Union
 Higher Institute for Agricultural Co-operation
 Higher Institute of Co-operative Management Studies
 General Authority for Construction and Housing Cooperatives

Gambia 
 Federation of Agricultural Co-operative Societies (FACS)
 National Association of Cooperative Credit Unions of The Gambia (NACCUG)

Ghana 
 Ghana Co-operative Council (GCC)
Ghana Co-operative Credit Unions Association (CUA)

Kenya 
 CIC Insurance Group Limited (CIC)  formerly The Co-operative Insurance Company of Kenya
 Co-operative Bank of Kenya (CBK)
 Kenya Union Of Savings and Credit Co-operatives (KUSCCO)

Mauritius 
 Mauritius Co-operative Savings And Credit League

Morocco 
 Office du Développement de la Coopération (ODC)

Namibia 
 Co-operatives Advisory Board

Nigeria 
 Co-operative Federation of Nigeria (CFN)

Senegal Union 
 Nationale des Coopératives Agricoles (UNCAS)

Somalia 
 Union of the Somali Cooperative Movements (UDHIS)
 Ururka Dhaqdhaqaaqa Iskaashatooyinka Soomaaliyeed    (UDHIS)

Somaliland 
 Somaliland Cooperatives Development institute (SLCDI)

South Africa 
 National Co-operative Association of South Africa (NCASA)
 National Association For Cooperative Financial Institutions in South Africa (NACFISA)

Tanzania 
 Tanzania Federation of Co-operatives (TFC)

Uganda 
 Uganda Co-operative Alliance Ltd (UCA)
 Uganda Cooperative Savings and Credit Union (UCSCU)

Zambia 
 Zambia Co-operative Federation (ZCF)
 Care Cooperative Savings and Credit Society Limited

South and Central America

Argentina 
 Confederación Cooperativa de la Republica Argentina (COOPERAR)
 Federación Argentina de Cooperativas de Consumo (FACC)
 Instituto Movilizador de Fondos Cooperativos (IMFC)
 Sancor Cooperativa de Seguros Ltda

Bolivia 
 Confederación Nacional de Cooperativas de Bolivia R.L. (CONCOBOL)

Brazil 
 Cooperativa de Consumo (COOP)
 Organização das Cooperativas Brasileiras (OCB)
 Unimed do Brasil, Confederaçao Nacional das Cooperativas Médicas

Chile 
 Cooperativa del Personal de la Universidad de Chile Ltda (COOPEUCH)

Colombia 
 Asociación Antioqueña de Cooperativas (CONFECOOP Antioquia)
 Asociación Colombiana de Cooperativas (ASCOOP)
 Casa Nacional del Profesor (CANAPRO)
 Confederación de Cooperativas de Colombia (CONFECOOP)
 Corporación Gimnasio Los Pinos
 Cooperativa del Magisterio (CODEMA)
 Cooperativa Médica del Valle y Profesionales (COOMEVA)
 Efectiva, Soluciones y Alternativas Comerciales
 Entidad Promotora de Salud (SALUDCOOP EPS)
 La Equidad Seguros Sociedad Cooperativa
 Progressa Entidad Cooperativa de los Empleados de Saludcoop

Costa Rica 
 Banco Popular y de Desarrollo Comunal (BPDC)
 Federación de Cooperativas de Ahorro y Crédito de Costa Rica, R.L. (FEDEAC, R.L.)

Dominican Republic 
 Consejo Nacional de Cooperativas (CONACOOP)
 Cooperativa Nacional de Seguros (COOPSEGUROS)
 Cooperativa Nacional de Servicios Multiples de los Maestros (COOPNAMA)
 Cooperativa Nacional de Servicios Múltiples de los Médicos (MEDICOOP)
 Cooperativa San Jose
 Instituo de Desarrollo y Credito Cooperativo (IDECOOP)

Ecuador 
 Coopseguros del Ecuador S.A.

El Salvador 
 Federación de Asociaciones Cooperativas de Ahorro y Crédito (FEDECACES)

Haiti 
 Conseil National des Coopératives (CNC)

Honduras 
 Cooperativa de Ahorro y Crédito "Sagrada Familia"
 Cooperativa Mixta Mujeres Unidas Ltda. (COMIXMUL)

Panama 
 Confederación Latinoamericana Cooperativas de Ahorro y Crédito (COLAC)

Paraguay 
 Confederación Paraguaya de Cooperativas (CONPACOOP)
 Cooperativa de Produccion, Consumo, Ahorro, Crédito y Servicios de Profesionales de la Salud Ltda (COOMECIPAR)
 Cooperativa Universitaria del Paraguay Ltda (CU)
 Federación de Cooperativas de Producción (FECOPROD)
 Panal Compañia de Seguros Generales S.A. (Propiedad Cooperativa)

Peru 
 Confederación Nacional de Cooperativas del Perú (CONFENACOOP)
 Cooperativa de Ahorro y Crédito (COOPETROPERU)
 Cooperativa de Ahorro y Crédito de Trabajadores de Empresas de Luz y Fuerza Eléctrica y Afines (CREDICOOP Luz y Fuerza Ltda.)

Puerto Rico 
 Cooperativa de Ahorro y Crédito de Arecibo (COOPACA)
 Cooperativa de Ahorro y Crédito de Lares y Región Central (LARCOOP)
 Cooperativa de Ahorro y Crédito de Médicos y Otros Profesionales de la Salud (MEDICOOP)
 Cooperativa de Ahorro y Crédito Dr. Manuel Zeno Gandia
 Cooperativa de Seguros de Vida de Puerto Rico (COSVI)
 Cooperativa de Seguros Múltiples de Puerto Rico
 Liga de Cooperativas de Puerto Rico

Uruguay 
 Centro Cooperativista Uruguayo (CCU)
 Confederación Uruguaya de Entidades Coops (CUDECOOP)
 Cooperativa Nacional de Ahorro y Crédito (COFAC)

Asia 
Asian Association of Confederations of Credit Unions (ACCU)

Bangladesh 
 Bangladesh Jatiya Samabaya Union (BJSU)

Cambodia 

 The Cambodia Community Savings Federation (CCSF)

China 
 All China Federation Of Supply & Marketing Co-operatives (ACFSMC)

India 
 Adarsh credit co-operative society ltd. (ACCS LTD)
 Andaman & Nicobar Islands Integrated Development Corporation Ltd. (ANIIDCO), Port Blair 744101
 Andhra Pradesh Dairy Development Co-operative Federation (APDDCF), Lalapet, Hyderabad 500017
 Bihar State Co-operative Milk Producers’ Federation
 The Eastern Railway Employees' Co-Operative Bank Ltd.
 Goa State Co-operative Milk Producers’ Union Ltd. Curti, Ponda 403401, Goa
 Gujarat State Co-operative Agriculture and Rural Development Bank Ltd., 489, Ashram road, Ahmedabad-9, Gujarat.
 Gujarat Co-operative Milk Marketing Federation Ltd. (GCMMF)
 Gujarat State Co-operative Cotton Federation. Ltd. Ahmedabad-9.
 Haryana Dairy Development Cooperative Federation Ltd. Sector 17-C, Chandigarh 160017
 Himachal Pradesh Co-operative Marketing and Consumers Federation   (HIMFED), Shimla
 Indian Farmers Fertiliser Co-operative (IFFCO)
 Kohima Dist Co-operative Milk Producers' Union Ltd., Milk Chilling Plant, Veterinary Compound, Burma Camp, Dimapur 797112
 Krishak Bharati Co-operative Ltd. (KRIBHCO)
 Karnataka Co-operative Milk Producers Federation    (KMF), KMF Complex, Dr M H Marigowda Rd, D R College PO, Bangalore 560029
 Kerala Co-operative Milk Marketing Federation  (KCMMF)
 Kerala State Co-operative Federation for Fisheries Development (Matsyafed), Karuvankonam, Thiruvananthapuram, Kerala.
 Southern Green Farming And Marketing Multi State cooperative society limited (Farmfed). 
 Maharashtra Rajya Sahakari Dudh Mahasangh Maryadit, NKM International House, 178 Backbay Reclamation, B M Chinai Marg, Mumbai 400020
 Manipur State Co-operative Milk Processing & Marketing Federation Ltd., Kesiampat Junction, Imphal 795001
 National Agricultural Co-operative Marketing Federation (NAFED)
 National Co-operative Agriculture & Rural Development Banks' Federation Ltd (NCARDB Federation)
 National Co-operative Consumers Federation (NCCF)
 National Co-operative Union of India (NCUI)
 National Federation of State Co-operative Banks (NAFSCOB)
 National Federation of Urban Co-operative Banks & Credit Societies Ltd (NAFCUB)
 Orissa State Co-operative Milk Producers' Federation Ltd., D-2 Sahid Nagar, Bhubaneswar 751007
 Pondicherry Co-op Milk Producers’ Union Ltd., Vazhudavoor Rd, Kurumampet, Pondicherry 605009
 Punjab State Co-operative Milk Producers’ Federation Ltd., New City Center, Sector 34-A, Chandigarh 160022
 Pradeshik Co-operative Federation or U.P. Co-operative Federation (PCF), Lucknow
 Rajasthan Co-operative Dairy Federation Ltd., Saras Sankul, Jawahar Lal Nehru Marg, Post Box No 1003, Jaipur 302017
 Sikkim Co-operative Milk Producers’ Union Ltd., PO Tadong, Gangtok 737102
 Tamil Nadu Co-operative Milk Producers’ Federation Ltd., Aavin Illam, Madhavaram Milk Colony, Chennai 600051
 Tripura Co-operative Milk Producers’ Union Ltd., Agartala Dairy, Indranagar, Agartala 799006
 West Bengal Co-operative Milk Producers’ Federation Ltd. Sector III, Salt Lake City, Calcutta 700091

Indonesia 
 Indonesian Co-operative Council (DEKOPIN)
 Institute for Indonesian Co-operative Development Studies (LSP2I)
 Credit Union Central of Indonesia (CUCO)

Iran 
 Central Organisation for Rural Co-operatives (CORC)
 Central Union of Rural Co-operatives (CURACI)
 Iran Chamber of Co-operatives
 Iran Meat Cooperatives Association

Israel 
 Central Union of Co-operative Societies
 Co-op Jerusalem of Alayers
 Kibbutz Movement

Japan 
 Central Union of Agricultural Cooperatives (JA-ZENCHU/CUAC)
 IE-NO-HIKARI Association
 Japan Agricultural News (Nihon Nogyo Shimbun)
 Japanese Consumers' Co-operative Union (JCCU)
 Japanese Workers Co-operative Union (JIGYODAN)
 National Federation of Agriculture Co-operative Associations (ZEN-NOH)
 National Federation of Fisheries Co-operative Associations (ZENGYOREN)
 National Federation of Forest Owners Co-operative Associations (ZENMORI-REN)
 National Federation of University Co-operative Associations (NFUCA)
 National Federation of Workers & Consumers Insurance Co-operatives (ZENROSAI)
 National Mutual Insurance Federation of Agricultural Cooperatives (ZENKYOREN)
 Norinchukin Bank

Kazakhstan 
 Union of Consumer Societies of Kazak (UCSK)

Korea 
 Korean Federation of Community Credit Co-operatives (KFCCC)
 National Credit Union Federation of Korea (NACUFOK)
 National Federation of Fisheries Co-operatives (NFFC)
 National Forestry Co-operatives Federation (NFCF)
 Nong Hyup (National Agricultural Co-operative Federation, NACF)

Kuwait 
 Union of Consumer Co-operative Societies (UCCS)

Malaysia 
 Cooperative College of Malaysia
 National Cooperative Organisation of Malaysia (ANGKASA)
 Association of Co-operative Credit Union Malaysia (ACCUM)
 The Workers Confederation of Credit Society Ltd. (KKP)

Mongolia 
 Mongolian Confederation of Credit Union (MOCCU)

Myanmar 
 Central Co-operative Society Ltd. (CCS)

Nepal 
 National Cooperative Bank Limited (NCBL)
 National Cooperative Federation of Nepal
 Nepal Federation of Savings & Credit Cooperative Unions (NEFSCUN)

Pakistan 
Karachi Co-operative Housing Societies Union

Palestine 
 The Agricultural Co-operative Union

Philippines 
 National Confederation of Cooperatives (NATCCO)
 Philippine Federation of Credit Cooperatives (PFCCO)
 Quezon City Union of Cooperatives (QCUC)
 Cooperative Union of Taguig and Pateros (COUNTPA)
 Victo National Federation of Co-operatives and Development Center (VICTO NATIONAL)

Singapore 
 Singapore National Co-operative Federation (SNCF)

Sri Lanka 
 Federation of Thrift & Credit Co-operative Societies Ltd in Sri Lanka (SANASA)
 National Co-operative Council of Sri Lanka (NCC)
 National Institute of Co-operative Development (NICD)
 Sri Lanka Consumer Co-operative Societies Federation Ltd (CoopfeD)

Thailand 
 Co-operative League of Thailand (CLT)
 Credit Union League of Thailand Ltd.(CULT)
 The Federation of Savings and Credit Cooperatives of Thailand Ltd.(FSCT)

United Arab Emirates 
 Abu Dhabi Co-operative Society (ADCOOPS)

Vietnam 
 Vietnam Cooperatives Alliance (VCA)
 Central People's Credit Fund(CBV)

See also 
 Co-operatives
 Co-operative federation
 Market socialism

References

 
Mutualism (movement)
Lists of cooperatives

fr:Liste des fédérations coopératives